Events from the year 2005 in South Korea.

Incumbents
President: Roh Moo-hyun
Prime Minister: Lee Hae-chan

Events 

 July 8: 42nd Grand Bell Awards
 September 8: Manhunt International 2005
 November 27: 2005 Mnet Asian Music Awards
 December 1: The Truth and Reconciliation Commission is established.
 2005 anti-Japanese demonstrations
 X-file scandal
 The Peace Dam is completed.

Sport
 South Korea at the 2005 Asian Indoor Games
 South Korea at the 2005 East Asian Games
 South Korea at the 2005 World Championships in Athletics
 2005 Asian Athletics Championships
 2005 Asian Canoe Slalom Championships
 2005 EAFF Women's Football Championship
 2005 in South Korean football

Film
 List of South Korean films of 2005

Births

 February 18 - So Junghwan, member of the band Treasure, Child Actor 
 February 21 - Hong Hwa-ri, actress
 July 8 - Kim Ji-young, actress
 October 17 - Hwang Min-woo, actor & singer

Deaths
 February 22 - Lee Eun-ju, actress (b. 1980)

See also
 2005 in South Korean music

References

 
South Korea
South Korea
Years of the 21st century in South Korea
2000s in South Korea